The 1980 Ballon d'Or, given to the best football player in Europe as judged by a panel of sports journalists from UEFA member countries, was awarded to Karl-Heinz Rummenigge on 30 December 1980.

Rummenigge was the third (West) German national to win the award after Gerd Müller in 1970 and Franz Beckenbauer in 1972 and 1976. After these two players, Rummenigge was also the third Bayern Munich player to win the trophy.

Rankings

Notes

References

External links
 France Football Official Ballon d'Or page

1980
1980–81 in European football